Bioche's rules, formulated by the French mathematician  (1859–1949), are rules to aid in the computation of certain indefinite integrals in which the integrand contains sines and cosines.

In order to calculate , consider the integrand . The translations and reflections are ones that correspond to the symmetries and periodicities of the basic trigonometric functions.

Bioche's rules state that:

 In all other cases, use .

Because rules 1 and 2 involve flipping the t axis, they flip the sign of dt, and therefore the behavior of ω under these transformations differs from that of ƒ by a sign. Although the rules could be stated in terms of ƒ, stating them in terms of ω has a mnemonic advantage, which is that we choose the change of variables u(t) that has the same symmetry as ω.

These rules can be, in fact, stated as a theorem: one shows that the proposed change of variable reduces (if the rule applies and if f is actually of the form ) to the integration of a rational function in a new variable, which can be calculated by partial fraction decomposition.

Case of polynomials 
To calculate the integral , Bioche's rules apply as well.

 If p and q are odd, one uses ;
 If p is odd and q even, one uses ;
 If p is even and q odd, one uses ;
 If not, one is reduced to lineariz.

Another version for hyperbolic functions 
Suppose one is calculating .

In every case, the change of variable  allows one to reduce to a rational function, this last change of variable being most interesting in the fourth case.

Examples

Example 1
As a trivial example, consider

Then  is an odd function, but under a reflection of the t axis about the origin, ω stays the same. That is, ω acts like an even function. This is the same as the symmetry of the cosine, which is an even function, so the mnemonic tells us to use the substitution  (rule 1). Under this substitution, the integral becomes . The integrand involving transcendental functions has been reduced to one involving a rational function (a constant).

Example 2
The integrand in

has the same symmetries as the one in example 1, so we use the same substitution . So

This transforms the integral into

which can be integrated using partial fractions, since . The result is that

Example 3
Consider

where . Although the function f is even, the integrand as a whole ω is odd, so it does not fall under rule 1. It also lacks the symmetries described in rules 2 and 3, so we fall back to the last-resort substitution .

Using  and a second substitution  leads to the result

References

 Zwillinger, Handbook of Integration, p. 108
 Stewart, How to Integrate It: A practical guide to finding elementary integrals, pp. 190−197.

Integral calculus
Theorems in calculus